Bettina-von-Arnim-Preis was a literary prize of Germany. It was named after German author Bettina von Arnim and was awarded between 1992 and 2003. First place prize winners received €12,500.

References

German literary awards
1992 establishments in Germany
2003 disestablishments in Germany
Awards established in 1992
Awards disestablished in 2003